Margaret Elizabeth Whiting (born 8 February 1933) is a British actress. She was nominated in 1978 for a Saturn Award as "Best Supporting Actress" in Sinbad and the Eye of the Tiger. She is an alumna and Associate Member of RADA.

Theatre
 1956:      Timon of Athens at Old Vic Theatre
 1956-1957: Titus Andronicus, The Comedy of Errors, and Antony and Cleopatra at the Old Vic Theatre
 1973:      Titus Andronicus at the Aldwych Theatre
 1974-1976: John Gabriel Borkman, The Grand Manoeuvres, Equus, Heartbreak House, No Man's Land, Happy Days, The Misanthrope, Comedians, Phaedra Britannica, Engaged, The Playboy of the Western World, Plunder, Hamlet, and Judgement at the Old Vic Theatre
 1976:  Tamburlaine the Great, The Playboy of the Western World, Il Campiello, Hamlet, Counting the Ways at the Olivier Theatre
 1984:      The Way of the World as Mrs. Marwood at the HaymarketFilmography
 The Password Is Courage - French farm woman (1962)
 The Informers - Maisie Barton (1963)
 The Counterfeit Constable - La femme de l'agent 202 (1964)
 Mister Quilp - Mrs. Jiniwin (1975)
 Sinbad and the Eye of the Tiger - Zenobia (1977)
 The Secret Garden'' - Nurse Boggs (1987)

TV work
 Those Whiting Girls - Desilu Studios (1955-1957) (TV serial)
 The Count of Monte Cristo: A Toy For The Infanta - Queen Maria (1956) (TV serial)
 Theatre 70: Till Murder Do Us Part (1960) (TV serial)
 The Cheaters: The Weasel - Jane (1960) (TV serial)
 ITV Play of the Week: The Plough and the Stars - Nora Clitheroe (1961) (TV serial)
 BBC Sunday-Night Play: Somewhere for the Night - Kitty (1961) (TV serial)
 No Hiding Place - Blanche Farrel (1961) (TV serial)
 The Avengers: The Yellow Needle - Jacquetta Brown (1961) (TV serial)
 ITV Play of the Week: A Letter from the General - Sister Henry (1962) (TV serial)
 Studio 4: Summer Storm - Elena (1962) (TV serial)
 Crane: The Third Bullet - Tina Mondrego (1964) (TV serial)
 The Human Jungle: Struggle for a Mind - Angie (1964) (TV serial)
 Festival: Six Characters in Search of an Author - Step-daughter (1964) (TV serial)
 ITV Play of the Week: The Wife of Knightsbridge - Perdita Street (1964) (TV serial)
 Public Eye - Nancy Heuston (1965) (TV serial)
 Thursday Theatre - Juliette (1965) (TV serial)
 Knock on Any Door: The Machine Minder - Alice Hall (1965) (TV serial)
 Undermind: Too Many Enemies - Alice (1965) (TV serial)
 No Hiding Place - Clare Store (1965) (TV serial)
 Armchair Theatre - Betty (1965) (TV serial)
 BBC Plays: The House (1965) (TV serial)
 Love Story: A Dream In The Afternoon - Kate (1967) (TV serial)
 Public Eye: The Beater and the Game - Margaret Smeaton (1971) (TV serial)
 The Strauss Family - Hetti (1972) (TV serial)
 ITV Sunday Night Theatre: Before Paris - Ruth (1972) (TV serial)
 Two Women - Cesira (1973) (TV serial)
 The Sweeney: Hit and Run - Fladge (1975) (TV serial)
 Play for Today: The After Dinner Game - Gaynor Humbolt (1975) (TV serial)
 Public Eye: Fit of Conscience - Evelyn Friendly (1975) (TV serial)
 Disraeli - Lady Blessington (1978) (TV serial)
 BBC2 Play of the Week: Langrishe Go Down - Maureen Layde (1978) (TV serial) 
 BBC2 Playhouse: Going Gently - Sister Marvin (1981) (TV serial)
 Artemis 81 - Laura Guise (1981) (TV play)
 Jury - Ann Coombs (1983) (TV serial)
 Shroud for a Nightingale - Delia Dettinger (1984)
 C.A.T.S. Eyes: Good as New - Mrs. Walker (1986) (TV serial)
 Rumpole of the Bailey: Rumpole for the Prosecution - Mrs. Fabian (1991) (TV serial)
 McCallum: City of Dead - Victoria Wells (1998) (TV serial)
 Let Them Eat Cake - 2nd Aristocratic Woman (1999) (TV serial)

Personal life
She was married to actor Colin Blakely from 1961 until his death in 1987; the couple had three sons, including twins.

References

External links

Profile, aveleyman.com
Profile, movie-dude.co.uk

1933 births
Living people
20th-century English actresses
21st-century English actresses
English film actresses
English television actresses
English stage actresses
Actresses from Bristol